Dorotheus was a Patriarch of the Bulgarian Orthodox Church in the beginning of the 14th century. His name is known only from the medieval Book of Boril where he is listed as the seventh Patriarch presiding over the Bulgarian Church from Tarnovo, the capital of the Bulgarian Empire. Dorotheus led the Bulgarian Church during the reign of Emperor Theodore Svetoslav (r. 1300–1321), who had his predecessor Patriarch Joachim III executed for treason in 1300.

References

Sources 
 

13th-century births
14th-century deaths
14th-century Bulgarian people
Patriarchs of Bulgaria
People from Veliko Tarnovo